Vlado Babić (born 1960) is a politician in Serbia from the country's Bunjevac community. He has served in the National Assembly of Serbia since 2014 as a member of the Serbian Progressive Party.

Private career
Babić is a medical doctor educated at the University of Novi Sad and based in Sombor in the Autonomous Province of Vojvodina. He was a member of the National Council of the Bunjevac National Minority from 2002 to 2010, at a time when council members were chosen by indirect election. He received the eleventh position on an electoral list led by council president Suzana Kujundžić Ostojić in the 2014 national council election; the list won only four seats, and he was not returned for a new term.

Political career
Babić contested Sombor's first electoral division in the 2004 Vojvodina provincial election as a candidate of a local organization called the Convention for Sombor. He ran for the same seat in the 2008 provincial elections as a candidate of the Serbian Radical Party. He was not elected on either occasion. The Radical Party split following the 2008 elections, and Babić joined the breakaway Progressive Party.

Babić became a member of the Serbian parliament shortly after the 2014 parliamentary election, in which he received the 164th position on the Progressive Party's Aleksandar Vučić — Future We Believe In list. The list won a landslide victory with 158 seats out of 250; Babić, who narrowly missed winning election outright, was able to take his seat on May 10, 2014, after members further up the list resigned to take government positions. He was promoted to the 118th position on the Progressive Party's list (renamed as Aleksandar Vučić – Serbia Is Winning) in the 2016 election and was declared elected when the alliance won a second consecutive landslide victory with 131 mandates.

In 2015, while serving as chair of the legislative committee on reproductive health, he chaired a panel discussion on the treatment of cervical cancer. He is currently a member of the committee on the diaspora and Serbs in the region; a member of the committee on labour, social issues, social inclusion, and poverty reduction; a deputy member of the health and family committee; and a member of the parliamentary friendship groups for Belarus, Croatia,  Cyprus, Greece, Hungary, Israel, Italy, Kazakhstan, Russia, Slovakia, and Tunisia.

Babić joined the parliamentary group of the Alliance of Vojvodina Hungarians (Vajdasági Magyar Szövetség; VMSZ) in early 2020. This allowed the VMSZ to maintain official parliamentary status after another delegate had left the group. Babić remains a member of the Progressive Party.

He was not a candidate for re-election in the 2020 Serbian parliamentary election.

Electoral record

Provincial (Vojvodina)

References

1960 births
Living people
Members of the National Assembly (Serbia)
Members of the Bunjevac National Council (Serbia)
Politicians from Sombor
Bunjevci
Serbian Radical Party politicians
Serbian Progressive Party politicians